Elżbieta Rabsztyn (born 25 August 1956 in Warsaw) is a retired Polish athlete specialising in the sprint hurdles. She won a bronze medal at the 1981 Summer Universiade.

Her personal bests are 12.80 seconds in the 110 metres hurdles (+1.9 m/s, Warsaw 1980) and 8.03 seconds in the 60 metres hurdles (Sindelfingen 1980).

In 1982 she married German hurdler Harald Schmid. They have two children, Alexander and Bianca, who also competed in athletics. Her sister, Grażyna Rabsztyn, is also a former hurdler.

International competitions

References

1956 births
Living people
Polish female hurdlers
Athletes from Warsaw
Universiade bronze medalists for Poland
Universiade medalists in athletics (track and field)
Medalists at the 1981 Summer Universiade